This is a listing of people who were involved in the formation and growth of Maratha Empire.
The Maratha Empire or the Maratha Confederacy was an Indian power that existed from 1647 to 1818. At its peak, the empire covered a territory of over 2.8 million km². The Marathas are credited to a large extent for ending the Mughal rule in India.

People

References

See also

 Javji Bamble
 Govind Rao Khare
 Chatrapati Shivaji
 Maratha Empire
 Bhat family

India history-related lists
Maratha Empire